The Bethlehem Township School District is a community public school district that serves students in kindergarten through eighth grade from Bethlehem Township, in Hunterdon County, New Jersey, United States.

As of the 2017-18 school year, the district and its two schools had an enrollment of 374 students and 44.5 classroom teachers (on an FTE basis), for a student–teacher ratio of 8.4:1.

The district is classified by the New Jersey Department of Education as being in District Factor Group "I", the second-highest of eight groupings. District Factor Groups organize districts statewide to allow comparison by common socioeconomic characteristics of the local districts. From lowest socioeconomic status to highest, the categories are A, B, CD, DE, FG, GH, I and J.

Public school students in ninth through twelfth grades attend North Hunterdon High School in Annandale, which also serves students from Clinton Town, Clinton Township, Franklin Township, Lebanon Borough and Union Township. As of the 2017-18 school year, the high school had an enrollment of 1,655 students and 128.7 classroom teachers (on an FTE basis), for a student–teacher ratio of 12.9:1. The school is part of the North Hunterdon-Voorhees Regional High School District, which also includes students from Califon, Glen Gardner, Hampton, High Bridge, Lebanon Township and Tewksbury Township, who attend Voorhees High School.

Schools
Schools in the district (with 2017-18 enrollment data from the National Center for Education Statistics) are:
Elementary school
Thomas B. Conley Elementary School with 226 students in grades K-5
Jane Smith, Principal
Middle school
Ethel Hoppock Middle School with 147 students in grades 6-8
Dr. Gregory Farley, Principal

Extracurricular activities
 Band
 Chorus
 Peer2Peer
 Student Council
 Debate Club
 Reading Olympics
 Battle of the Books

Administration
Core members of the district's administration are:
Dr. Gregory Farley, Chief School Administrator
Beverly Vlietstra, Interim Business Administrator / Board Secretary

The district's board of education has seven members who set policy and oversee the fiscal and educational operation of the district through its administration. As a Type II school district, the board's trustees are elected directly by voters to serve three-year terms of office on a staggered basis, with either two or three seats up for election each year held (since 2012) as part of the November general election.

References

External links
Bethlehem Township School District
 
School Data for the Bethlehem Township School District, National Center for Education Statistics
North Hunterdon-Voorhees Regional High School District

Bethlehem Township, New Jersey
New Jersey District Factor Group I
School districts in Hunterdon County, New Jersey